Barbosa Ferraz may refer to:
Salomão Barbosa Ferraz (1880–1969), Brazilian priest and bishop
Barbosa Ferraz, Paraná

See also
Barbosa (disambiguation)
Ferraz